The 2017 Youth World Weightlifting Championships was held in Bangkok, Thailand from 1 April to 11 April, 2017.

Medal overview

Men

Women

Medal table
Ranking by Big (Total result) medals
 

Ranking by all medals: Big (Total result) and Small (Snatch and Clean & Jerk)

Team ranking

Men

Women

References 

Results Book
 https://www.pzpc.pl/public/imprezy/2017/Bangkok2017_ResultsBook.pdf

IWF Youth World Weightlifting Championships
International sports competitions hosted by Thailand
2017 in weightlifting
2017 in Thai sport
April 2017 sports events in Asia
Sport in Bangkok